Dotsero is a  wide by  deep maar volcano located in Dotsero, Colorado near the junction of the Colorado River and the Eagle River. It is classified as a scoria cone with evaporitic rock, basaltic tephra, and oxidized sandstone. Erupting approximately 4200 years ago, it is the youngest volcano in Colorado.

Eruption information 
This Holocene volcano erupted in the year 2220 ± 300 years B.C. When Dotsero did erupt, it created small scoria cones that were constructed along a NNE-SSW line on either side of the maar. The eruption date is based upon radiocarbon dating of wood found underneath some of the scoria.

Dotsero, and all volcanoes that have erupted in the past 10,000 years, are more likely to become active again. The United States Geological Survey considers it a moderate threat to impact air travel if it were to erupt.

Interstate 70 cuts across the lava flow. At the base of the volcano is a mobile home park.

References

Landforms of Eagle County, Colorado
Diatremes of Colorado
Maars of the United States
Dormant volcanoes
Volcanoes of Colorado